Puerto Rico Highway 165 (PR-165) is the road that goes from Naranjito to Guaynabo. The highway passes by Toa Alta, Toa Baja, Dorado, Levittown, Cataño and Guaynabo.

The PR-165 begins in the PR-164 (road from Naranjito to Corozal) and ends at San Patricio (near Caparra). From Naranjito to Toa Alta it is a rural road. In Toa Baja it becomes a divided highway. In Dorado the road is one lane in each direction and parallel to the northern coast of Puerto Rico. In Levittown  it becomes a divided highway before ending at San Patricio. In Cataño it is a short highway which begins at the Bacardi Distillery and ends at the Federal Prison.

Major intersections

Related routes

Puerto Rico Highway 165R

Puerto Rico Highway 165R (abbreviated Ramal PR-165 or PR-165R) is the road that goes to downtown Toa Alta, Puerto Rico.  This road can be seen as the Business 165, since this road was the PR-165 through the area from the town center.

Puerto Rico Highway 6165

Puerto Rico Highway 6165 (PR-6165) is the road that goes to downtown Dorado, Puerto Rico from PR-165.  This road can be seen as the Business spur 165 because it connects PR-165 with PR-693 in downtown area.

See also

 List of highways numbered 165

References

External links

 PR-165, Toa Alta, Puerto Rico

165